Walter Greene was a composer.

Walter Greene may also refer to:
Sir Raymond Greene, 2nd Baronet (Walter Raymond Greene), British politician
Walter S. Greene, American politician
Walter Greene (multihull designer), multihull sailboat designer and builder

See also
Walter Massy-Greene
Walter Green (disambiguation)